Gabriele Münter (19 February 1877 – 19 May 1962) was a German expressionist painter who was at the forefront of the Munich avant-garde in the early 20th century. She studied and lived with the painter Wassily Kandinsky and was a founding member of the expressionist group Der Blaue Reiter.

Early life
Münter was born to upper middle-class parents in Berlin on 19 February 1877. Her family supported her desires to become an artist. Her father died in 1886. She began to draw as a child. As she was growing up, she had a private tutor. In 1897, at the age of twenty, Münter received artistic training in the Düsseldorf studio of artist Ernst Bosch and later at the Damenschule (Women's School) with artist Willy Spatz.

By the time she was 21 years old, both of her parents had died and she was living at home with no occupation. In 1898, she decided to take a trip to America with her sister to visit extended family. They stayed in America for more than two years, mainly in the states of Texas, Arkansas, and Missouri; six sketchbooks survive from Münter's period in America, depicting images of people, plants and landscapes. Both girls had inherited a large amount of money, allowing them to live freely and independently. Her childhood and early adulthood greatly impacted her future artistic career. She had a free and unrestricted life that was unconstrained by convention. Münter studied woodcut techniques, sculpture, painting, and printmaking.

In 1901, she attended the beginners' classes of Maximilian Dasio at the Damenakademie (Women's Academy) of the Münchener Künstlerinnenverein (Munich Women Artists's Association). Münter then studied at the Phalanx School in Munich, an avant-garde institution founded by Russian artist, Wassily Kandinsky. At the Phalanx School, Münter attended sculpture courses taught by Wilhelm Hüsgen. Münter studied outside the official art academies in Munich and Düsseldorf, as these were closed to women.  At the Phalanx School, Münter was introduced to Post-Impressionism and the marking techniques of a palette knife and a brush. Her vivid colors and bold outlines were somewhat derived from Gauguin and the Fauves whom she admired. Along with this, Münter was inspired by Bavarian folk art, particularly the technique of reverse-glass painting (Hinterglasmalerei in German).

Soon after she began taking classes, Münter became professionally involved with Kandinsky. This eventually turned into a personal relationship that lasted for over a decade. Kandinsky was the first teacher that had actually taken Münter's painting abilities seriously. In the summer of 1902, Kandinsky invited Münter to join him at his summer painting classes just south of Munich in the Alps, and she accepted.

Work 

Münter was heavily focused on German Expressionism, and she worked in various mediums, including a significant output in wood- and linocuts. She kept a journal and documented her journeys with a state-of-the-art camera. She was familiar with many of the more famous artists of the time; in one of her journals, she stated that she wanted to learn from the avant-garde artists in France.

Münter was part of a small subgroup of artists active in transforming late Impressionist, Neo-Impressionist, and Jugendstil (or Art Nouveau) painting into the more radical, non-naturalistic art now identified as Expressionism. Early on, Münter developed a great interest in landscapes. Münter's landscape paintings employ a radical Jugendstil simplicity and suggestive symbolism with softly muted colors, collapsed pictorial space and flattened forms. She enjoyed exploring the world of children; using colorful prints of children and toys, Münter shows precision and simplicity of form in her rejection of symbolic content.

By 1908, her work began to change. Strongly influenced by Matisse and Fauvism, Gauguin, and van Gogh, Münter's work became more representative and she took refuge in the small Bavarian market town of Murnau, a village untouched by industrialization, progress, and technology. Münter bought a house in Murnau and spent much of her life there. It was here, in Münter's landscape paintings, that she emphasized nature, imaginative landscapes and an opposition to German modernism. Münter's landscapes are unusual in their use of blues, greens, yellows, and pinks; and color plays a large role in Münter's early works. Color is used to evoke feelings: picturesque, inviting, imaginative, and rich in fantasy. In Münter's landscapes, she presents the village and countryside as manifestations of human life; there is a constant interaction and coexistence with nature.

Münter and Kandinsky's relationship affected Kandinsky's work. He began to adopt Münter's use of saturated colors and abstract expressionist style. Münter and Kandinsky traveled through Europe including the Netherlands, Italy, and France, as well as North Africa. It was during this time that they met Rousseau and Matisse. Münter and Kandinsky helped establish the Munich-based avant-garde group called the New Artists’ Association (Neue Künstlervereinigung). She contributed to a number of the most significant avant-garde exhibitions in Germany up till World War I.

In 1911 Münter was one of the first artists to exhibit with Kandinsky's German Expressionist group known as Der Blaue Reiter (The Blue Rider). Within the group, artistic approaches and aims varied amongst artists; however, they shared a common desire to express spiritual truths through art. They championed modern art, the connection between visual art and music, the spiritual and symbolic associations of color and a spontaneous, intuitive approach to painting in its move toward abstraction.

There is a transition in Münter's work from copying nature more or less impressionistically to feeling its content, abstracting, and drawing out an extract. There grew an interest in painting the spirit of the modern civilization, its social and political turmoil and its gravitation towards materialism and alienation. Münter noted that pictures are all moments of life: instantaneous visual experiences, generally rapid and spontaneous; her paintings each have their own identity, their own shape, and their own function.

For Münter, it is the use of color that expresses these ideas. The German Expressionists moved towards primitive art as a model of abstraction or non-representational, non-academic, non-bourgeois art. The German artist looked not for harmony of outward appearance, but for the mystery hidden behind the external form. He (or she) was interested in the soul of things, wanting to lay it bare.

Later years

When World War I began, Münter and Kandinsky relocated to Switzerland. In 1914, Kandinsky returned to Russia without her, and his marriage in 1917 to Nina Andreevskaya marked the end of Münter and Kandinsky's relationship. Subsequently, there was a period of inactivity in her art career. She returned a number of paintings and drawings to Kandinsky, and stored other pieces in a warehouse for many years. She resumed painting in the late 1920s after she had moved back to Germany with Johannes Eichner after the war.

In the 1930s, as tension started to grip Europe, and modernist movements were condemned in Germany by the Nazi government, she had all of the art work done by her, Kandinsky, and the other members of the Blaue Reiter transported to her house, where she hid them. In spite of her financial problems, she preserved them with care during World War II. Through several house searches, the pieces were never found.

On her eightieth birthday, Münter gave her entire collection, which consisted of more than 80 oil paintings and 330 drawings, to the Städtische Galerie in the Lenbachhaus in Munich. In 1956, Münter received a few awards such as the Culture Prize from the City of Munich. Münter's work was exhibited in the 1960s in the US for the first time and was shown at Mannheim Kunsthalle in 1961. When she was with Johannes Eichner, she still continued to represent the movement.

The Gabrielle Münter and Johannes Eichner foundation was established and has become a valuable research center for Münter's art, as well as the art that was done by the Blaue Reiter group. Münter lived the rest of her life in Murnau, traveling back and forth to Munich. She died at home in Murnau am Staffelsee on 19 May 1962.

In 2018, the Louisiana Museum of Modern Art of Copenhagen, Denmark, ran an exhibition from May to August with about 130 works by Gabriele Münter, many of which were being shown for the first time, in the artist's first comprehensive retrospective in decades.

Style 
Münter's style evolved over the course of her career. Her early works from her days at the Phalanx school show an extensive use of the palette knife and a limited color range of yellows, greens and browns. Her subsequent landscapes, many of which were painted in Murnau, employed strong contours around a palette of blue, green, yellow, and pink, often with red for emphasis.  Throughout her career, color continued to play a large role in her work. In the early 1920s, Münter painted portraits with the minimal line and compositional clarity valued in Neue Sachlichkeit circles of the day.

References

Sources
 Behr, Shulmith, Movements in Modern Art: Expressionism. Cambridge University Press, 1999.

See also
 List of German women artists

External links 

 Works and biography, Galerie Ludorff, Düsseldorf, Germany
 "German Expressionism" in the 2009 Encyclopædia Britannica Online
 Gabriele Münter profile at the National Museum of Women in the Arts
 Gabriele Münter at Museum Ludwig, Cologne

1877 births
1962 deaths
19th-century German painters
20th-century German painters
20th-century German women artists
19th-century German women artists
Artists from Berlin
People from the Province of Brandenburg
German Expressionist painters
German women painters
People from Garmisch-Partenkirchen (district)